Eric Goldman (born April 15, 1968) is a law professor at Santa Clara University School of Law. He also co-directs the law school's High Tech Law Institute and co-supervises the law school's Privacy Law Certificate.

Career overview
Goldman is a leading expert in the fields of Internet Law and Intellectual Property. He was part of the first wave of teaching Internet Law courses in law schools, having taught his first course in 1995–96. He has testified before Congress on the Consumer Review Fairness Act, Stop Enabling Sex Traffickers Act (SESTA), and Allow States and Victims to Fight Online Sex Trafficking Act (FOSTA). In a well-publicized December 2005 post to his Technology & Marketing Law Blog, Goldman incorrectly predicted Wikipedia's demise in five years. Goldman has co-authored (with Rebecca Tushnet of Harvard Law) the first Advertising & Marketing Law casebook for the law school community.

He has been shortlisted as an "IP Thought Leader" by Managing IP magazine and named an "IP Vanguard" by the California State Bar's Intellectual Property section.

Goldman publishes the Technology & Marketing Law Blog, which covers Internet Law, Intellectual Property, and Advertising Law. The blog has received several awards, including being named to the ABA Journal'''s Blawg 100 Hall of Fame.

Some of Goldman's other projects include DoctoredReviews.com, a website designed to combat doctors' efforts to suppress patients' reviews; serving on the board of directors of the Public Participation Project, a group lobbying for federal anti-SLAPP legislation; providing copyright advice to Justin.tv; and coauthoring an amicus brief in the 1-800 Contacts, Inc. v. WhenU.com, Inc. case with the Electronic Frontier Foundation.

Before he joined the faculty at Santa Clara University, he was an assistant professor at Marquette University Law School, General Counsel of Epinions.com, and a technology transactions attorney at Cooley Godward.

 Scholarship 
Select publications
 .
 .
 .
 .
 .

BooksAdvertising & Marketing Law: Cases and Materials (2nd Edition, 2014; 3rd Edition, 2016; 4th Edition, 2018)  co-authored with Rebecca Tushnet (the first casebook on this topic)  INTERNET LAW: CASES & MATERIALS (2014; 2015; 2016; 2017; 2018; 2019 editions) Find Kitty Nala (co-authored with Lisa Goldman) (2016)

Awards and professional recognition
2005 Marquis Who's Who in American Education
2005 Marquis Who's Who in American Law
2009-2016 He was named to the ABA Journal's Blawg 100  and inducted into the ABA Journal's “Blawg 100 Hall of Fame” in 2016
2011 IP Vanguard Award for academics/public policy, awarded by the IP Section of the California State Bar 
2012 and 2013 He was named to a shortlist of North American “IP Thought Leaders,” Managing Intellectual Property magazine .
2013-2017 He was named one of the "20 Most-Cited Intellectual Property & Cyberlaw Scholars in the U.S. for the period 2013-2017" and “20 Most-Cited Intellectual Property & Cyberlaw Faculty, 2010-2014 (inclusive)” (as ranked by Brian Leiter)
2015 He was named as one of the Fastcase 50 "Eric Goldman Named one of 2015’s Fastcase 50" Santa Clara University School of Law: Faculty News
2018 World Technology Awards, Law Division Finalist (one of six in the world)
2019 His casebook INTERNET LAW: CASES & MATERIALS'' was named as one of the "100 Best Intellectual Property Books of All Time" and "100 Best Privacy Books of All Time," 2019
2019 He received the Santa Clara University Award for Sustained Excellence in Scholarship

References

External links
Eric Goldman's blog

Living people
American legal scholars
Santa Clara University School of Law faculty
People from Madison, Wisconsin
University of California, Los Angeles alumni
Copyright scholars
1968 births